Leif B. Lillegaard (1 May 1918, Sandnessjøen – 24 April 1994) was a Norwegian journalist and newspaper editor, radio reporter and novelist.

Career 
He was editor for the newspaper Harstad Tidende, a journalist for the newspaper Morgenbladet, and a freelance radio reporter for the Norwegian Broadcasting Corporation.

He made his literary debut in 1963, with a book on the 1943 Filipstad explosion.

He wrote more than one hundred books, both fiction and non-fiction, and was awarded the Norwegian Booksellers' Prize in 1981 for the story .

References

1918 births
1994 deaths
People from Alstahaug
Norwegian newspaper editors
NRK people
People educated at the Haagaas School
20th-century Norwegian novelists